Mürzsteg is a former municipality in the district of Bruck-Mürzzuschlag in the Austrian state of Styria. Since the 2015 Styria municipal structural reform, it is part of the municipality Neuberg an der Mürz.

Culture and sightseeing

Museums 
 Holzknechtmuseum

Buildings 
 Mürzsteg Hunting Lodge: Originally a lodge of the Emperor of Austria, now a summer residence of the President of Austria. Not publicly accessible.

Population

References

Cities and towns in Bruck-Mürzzuschlag District